Hashem Ali Khan is a Awami League politician and the former Member of Parliament of Bogra-9.

Career
Khan was elected to parliament from Bogra-9 as an Awami League candidate in 1973.

References

Awami League politicians
Living people
1st Jatiya Sangsad members
Year of birth missing (living people)